Martinien Tega (born 11 December 1981) is a Cameroonian cyclist.

Major results

2003
 2nd Overall Grand Prix Chantal Biya
 1st Stage 7 Tour du Sénégal
2004
 1st National Road Race Championships
 1st Overall Tour du Cameroun
1st Stage 3
2006
 2nd Overall Tour du Faso
2008
 1st Stage 3 Tour du Sénégal
 1st Stage 3 Tour du Cameroun
 2nd Overall Tour du Cameroun
 5th Overall Tour du Faso
2009
 1st Stage 2 Tour du Cameroun
 1st Stage 3 Grand Prix Chantal Biya
 3rd National Road Race Championships
2010
 1st Overall Grand Prix Chantal Biya
1st Stage 1
 3rd Overall Tour du Cameroun
2011
 2nd Overall Tour du Cameroun
 2nd Overall Tour du Faso

References

1981 births
Living people
Cameroonian male cyclists